Le Bosquet is a station in the city of Cannes, southern France.

The station opened on 10 April 1870 when the line from Grasse to Cannes opened to passengers. Due to its position on a branch line from Grasse near the La Bocca Junction, it is close to its main line counterpart of La Bocca.

Le Bosquet is situated on the picturesque single line to Grasse, reopened in 2004.

Services
The station is served by regional trains (TER Provence-Alpes-Côte d'Azur) to Cannes, Grasse, Antibes and Nice.

References

Gare
TER Provence-Alpes-Côte-d'Azur
Railway stations in France opened in 1870
Railway stations in Alpes-Maritimes